The Constitution of the State of Maine established the "State of Maine" in 1820 and is the fundamental governing document of the state. It consists of a Preamble and ten Articles (divisions), the first of which is a "Declaration of Rights".

The preamble of Maine's Constitution spells it out: "Objects of government. We the people of Maine, in order to establish justice, insure tranquility, provide for our mutual defense, promote our common welfare, and secure to ourselves and our posterity the blessings of liberty, acknowledging with grateful hearts the goodness of the Sovereign Ruler of the Universe in affording us an opportunity, so favorable to the design; and, imploring God's aid and direction in its accomplishment, do agree to form ourselves into a free and independent State, by the style and title of the State of Maine and do ordain and establish the following Constitution for the government of the same."

History
The Maine Constitution was approved by Congress on March 4, 1820 as part of the Missouri Compromise since the Maine Constitution did not recognize slavery. The State of Maine was previously the District of Maine in the Commonwealth of Massachusetts. William King may have authored the largest part of the Maine Constitution, as he was the president of the Constitutional Convention and later elected Maine's first Governor.

Other authors of the constitution were Thomas Jefferson, John Chandler, Albion K. Parris, William Pitt Preble, and John Holmes. Thomas Jefferson authored the section of Article VIII on education. The Maine Constitution was approved by all 210 delegates to the Maine Constitutional Convention, which was held during October 1819, in Portland, Maine.

The Maine Constitution is the fourth-oldest operating state constitution in the country.

Preamble
The Preamble defines the following reasons for establishing the State of Maine, which would also have served as an expression of dissatisfaction with being the District of Maine:
 "establish justice",
 "insure tranquility",
 "provide for our mutual defense",
 "promote our common welfare",
 "secure to ourselves and our posterity the blessings of liberty".

The Preamble states that the people of Maine "do agree to form ourselves into a free and independent State, by the style and title of the State of Maine and do ordain and establish the following Constitution for the government of the same."

CONSTITUTION OF THE STATE OF MAINE

(as amended on the year of 1820)

PREAMBLE

We the people of Maine, in order to establish justice, insure tranquility, provide for our mutual defense, promote our common welfare, and secure to our selves and our posterity the blessings of liberty, acknowledging with grateful hearts the goodness of the Sovereign Ruler of the Universe in affording us an opportunity, so favorable to the design; and, imploring His aid and direct ion in its accomplishment, do agree to form ourselves into a free and independent State, by the style and title of the STATE OF MAINE, and do ordain and establish the following Constitution for the government of the same.

Article I. "Declaration of Rights"
This Article contains 24 sections, of which the longest is on religious freedom. The first section starts "All people are born equally free and independent, and have certain natural, inherent and unalienable rights." The beginning is similar to the Massachusetts Constitution of 1780 which used the phrase "born free and equal", the basis for which slavery was abolished in that state in 1820.

The section on religious freedom starts with "all individuals have a natural and unalienable right to worship Almighty God according to the dictates of their own consciences". This is notably different from the Massachusetts Constitution of 1780 which referred to the "duty of all men in society, publicly, and at stated seasons to worship the Supreme being.

Article II. "Electors" (Voters)
This article describes who may vote for Governor and members of the Maine Legislature. It states that every citizen of the United States of age 18 or older who has established residence in Maine shall be eligible to vote in state elections. There are certain exceptions such as "persons under guardianship for reasons of mental illness" and "persons in the military, naval or marine service of the United States." It was decided in 2001 that persons who are under guardianship are still permitted to vote.

Article III. "Distribution of Powers"
This article says that "the powers of this government shall be divided into 3 distinct departments, the legislative, executive and judicial." No person may assume a position in two of the branches at once.

Article IV: "House of Representatives, Senate, and Legislative Power"
Establishes the Maine House of Representatives and the Maine Senate which shall comprise the Maine Legislature. The number of members of each body are set, and their duties are described. This article also describes the establishment of districts, how members are elected by Electors in each district, the qualifications for office, a residency requirement, etc.

However this article also reserves to the people certain important powers. "The people reserve to themselves power to propose laws and to enact or reject the same at the polls independent of the Legislature." Also the people reserve the "power at their own option to approve or reject at the polls any Act, bill, resolve or resolution passed by the joint action of both branches of the Legislature, and the style of their laws and Acts shall be, 'Be it enacted by the people of the State of Maine.'"

"Legislative Powers" describes when the Legislature shall meet and allows the Governor 10 days to approve legislation. The Governor is also granted the "line-item veto of dollar amounts appearing in appropriation or allocation sections of legislative documents."

Also duties of the Legislature are described, however "all bills for raising a revenue shall originate in the House of Representative." This means if the Senate passes legislation which raises revenue it is constitutionally invalid if the House of Representatives has not previously acted on it.

Maine is one of  the states which prohibits the legislature from chartering corporations. This is dealt with in Article IV part Third Sections 13 and 14.

Section 13  Special legislation.  The Legislature shall, from time to time, provide, as far as practicable, by general laws, for all matters usually appertaining to special or private legislation.

Section 14  Corporations, formed under general laws.  Corporations shall be formed under general laws, and shall not be created by special Acts of the Legislature, except for municipal purposes, and in cases where the objects of the corporation cannot otherwise be attained; and, however formed, they shall forever be subject to the general laws of the State.

Despite the constitutional prohibition the legislature has embedded a complex corporate network of corporations that serve as "an instrumentality of the state" and declared to be "essential government functions" and are linked to a network of "public-private relationships" also referred to as 'quasis" and business consortiums". This has largely occurred since 1977 when the Maine Legislature chartered the Maine Development Foundation as a non-profit corporation to serve as an instrumentality of the state with the expressed intent to establish legislative authority to centrally manage Maine's economy:

§915. Legislative findings and intent: "There is a need to establish a new basis for a creative partnership of the private and public sectors ... but which does not compromise the public interest or the profit motive. The state's solitary burden to provide for development should lessen through involving the private sector in a leadership role ..... The foundation shall exist as a not-for-profit corporation with a public purpose, and the exercise by the foundation of the powers conferred by this chapter shall be deemed and held to be an essential governmental function.

In Governor Seldon Conner's inaugural address of 1876, he said these words pertaining to the new constitutional amendment:

"Section thirteen presents a discretionary field of action which your own honor will impel you to occupy to the fullest extent.'The title of 'Special and Private Laws,' which includes so large a portion of the laws of former Legislatures, is an obnoxious one, conveying suggestions of privilege, favoritism and monopoly; though happily these evils have not in fact, stained the character of our legislation, they should not be suffered to have, even in the form of our laws, any grounds of suspicion that can be removed. Other weighty objections to special laws for private benefit are, that they are obtained at the public expense, and in their passage distract the attention of legislators from matters of public interest. The opportunity is now afforded, and the duty enjoined upon you, by the amendment, to restrict the necessity for such laws to the narrowest possible limits. An analysis and classification of the private and special laws upon the statute books, will inform you of the objects for which it is desirable to provide by general laws, if practicable. 'Many objects have been hitherto specially legislated upon although they were amply provided for by general laws. I have distinguished authority for the statement that sixty or more of the corporations created by a special act for each, by the last Legislature, could have been created and organized under general laws. The reason why the general laws have not been resorted to a greater extent, is not, so far as I am informed, to be found in any insufficiency or defect of those laws, but in the greater ease and simplicity of the method of application to the Legislature and in the fancied higher [146 Me. 323] sanction of an authority proceeding directly from it. Section fourteen, relating to corporations is compressive and peremptory.. It relates to all corporations, except only those for municipal purposes. It clearly prohibits their creation by special acts if the objects desired can be secured under existing general laws."

Article V: "Executive Power, Secretary, Treasurer"
This article describes the powers, election, and duties of the Governor, Secretary of State and State Treasurer. The article gives to the Governor "the supreme executive power of this State". Also the Governor is given the title of the "commander in chief of the army and navy of the State, and of the militia, except when the same are called into the actual service of the United States."

The article also describes the compensation of the Governor and their power to appoint members of the judiciary who not directly elected, as well as civil and military officers.

Article VI: "Judicial Power"
This article establishes and describes the powers of the Maine Supreme Judicial Court, and such other courts as the Legislature shall from time to time establish." Also the length of office is set – 7 years, etc. Also judges and registers of probate are to be elected by voters in their respective counties.

This article also says that the Justices of the Maine Supreme Judicial Court "shall be obliged to give their opinion upon important questions of law, and upon solemn occasions, when required by the Governor, Senate or House of Representatives." Such an opinion is called an Advisory opinion.

Article VII: "Military"
This article describes the state militia,  and says that "all commissioned officers of  shall be appointed and commissioned by the Governor". This section also describes the Adjutant General of the Maine National Guard who is appointed by the Governor, and describes the organization, armament and discipline of.

This section also says that certain classes of people are exempted, such as the Quakers and Shakers, but otherwise "able-bodied" persons between the ages of 18 and 45 are not exempted from service in the militia.

Article VIII: "Education and Municipal Home Rule"
This section says the Legislature shall require towns to support public schools since "a general diffusion of the advantages of education being essential to the preservation of the rights and liberties of the people." Also authority is granted to "pledge the credit of the State and to issue bonds for loans to Maine students in higher education and their parents." Municipalities are granted the power to amend their charters and to issue bonds for industrial purposes.

Article IX: "General Provisions"
This section sets the oath of office, the date of elections, and allows for impeachment. It also states that all "taxes upon real and personal estate, assessed by authority of this State, shall be apportioned and assessed equally according to the just value thereof." However the Legislature is allowed to set special assessments for the following types of property, including: certain farms and agricultural lands, timberlands and woodlands, open space lands, and waterfront land that supports commercial fishing.

Section 14 deals with debt and the ratification of bonds. It sets a $2,000,000 debt and liability limit except to suppress insurrection, to repel invasion, or for purposes of war and provides conditions for temporary loans to be repaid within 12 months. It mandates that specific fiscal information must accompany bond questions presented on to the electorate and provides further stipulations on the issuing of bonds.

Section 14 A-D specifies conditions for insuring loans and bonds.

Article X: "Additional Provisions"
This section contains several sections with no stated overall theme.
Notably, Section 7 prohibits the printing of Sections 1, 2, and 5, while stating that they nonetheless remain in force.
The effect of this suppression with respect to Section 5 has been controversial, as described below.

Section 1 dictates the time, place, and apportionment of the first meeting of the legislature. (Printing disallowed by Section 7.)

Section 2 states the terms of the first office holders under the constitution. (Printing disallowed by Section 7.)

Section 3 confirms that previously existing laws will continue in force unless "repugnant to this constitution."

Section 4 defines the amendment process, which starts with the legislature.

Section 5 incorporates parts of the Massachusetts law authorizing its separation of Maine, including its stated original office holders.  (Printing disallowed by Section 7; as described below, this is a source of controversy.)

Section 6 tasks the Chief Justice to re-organize the constitution as it gets changed. "And the Constitution, with the amendments made thereto, in accordance with the provisions thereof, shall be the supreme law of the State."

Section 7 forbids the printing of sections 1, 2, and 5, while stating that they remain valid. The full text is:

Controversy over Section 7's suppression of Section 5

In 2015, Henry John Bear,
Representative for the Maliseet tribe,
introduced a bill (L.D. 893) proposing an amendment that would repeal Section 7's ban on printing Section 5.
In splitting from Massachusetts,
Maine was required to adopt its obligations and treaties with the tribes, and to set aside land for them.
These requirements are enumerated in Section 5, primarily in its subsection 5. (Bear introduced another version of this bill in 2017 as L.D. 428.)

One view is that Section 7 is simple bookkeeping for obsolete clauses.
Bear and others see
its suppression in print as symbolic of Maine neglecting its responsibilities to the tribes,
saying it has aided in them being forgotten by the state.
As an example, they point to 
a 1967 letter from Maine's Indian Affairs Commissioner Edward Hinckley.
Section 5 required Maine to set aside $30,000 worth of land for which Massachusetts paid the new state, but, Hinckley noted, no such land was allocated.

The section was adopted in 1875, officially as a "decluttering" of the constitution. State Senator Chris Johnson of Somerville, who assumed office in 2012, objected:
"We should not be hiding part of our guiding document that still is in force today."

Because the redacted sections have continued to be in effect, publishing Section 5 would have no other formal legal consequences.

It is debated whether the language in Section 5 has any current application
or if those clauses have all been superseded by later actions.

One direct consequence of Section 7 is that the bill to revoke it, L.D. 893, cannot legally contain the text of Section 5.

Historian Catherine M. Burns links the redaction of Article X, Section 5 to actions taken by the state in 1875 to settle Joseph Granger v. Peter Avery, a Maine Supreme Judicial Court case involving a dispute related to a 1794 Passamaquoddy treaty with Massachusetts. She published her findings in “ ‘It May Be Questionable’: Granger v. Avery and the Redaction of Article X, Section 5 from the Maine Constitution,” available in the Fall 2021 issue of the journal Maine History.

Text of Article X, Section 5 
The following is the text of Article 5:

See also
List of governors of Maine
Maine Legislature
Maine Supreme Judicial Court
Maine

References

External links
 Votes on Amendments to the Maine Constitution, 1911 – present

1820 documents
1820 in American law
1820 in Maine
March 1820 events
Constitution
Maine